1794 in sports describes the year's events in world sport.

Boxing
Events
 "Big Ben" Brain announced his comeback to the ring and he also reclaimed the Championship Title Of England.
 24 February — "Big Ben" Brain and William Wood were scheduled to fight but it was not held due to Brain being very ill.
 8 April — death of  Ben Brain from cirrhosis of the liver. The Championship of England became a vacant title.
 12 November — Daniel Mendoza defeated Bill Warr in five rounds at Bexley Common to claim the vacant Championship of England.  Mendoza held the title for six months until April 1795.

Cricket
Events
 Surrey gave odds to an England XI who fielded 13 men for two games against the county's eleven in September. This is believed to be the only time this has happened.
England
 Most runs – Billy Beldham 488
 Most wickets – Thomas Lord 44

Horse racing
England
 The Derby – Daedalus
 The Oaks – Hermione
 St Leger Stakes – Beningbrough

References

 
1794